Alex Eskin (born May 19, 1965) is an American mathematician. He is the Arthur Holly Compton Distinguished Service Professor in the Department of Mathematics at the University of Chicago. His research focuses on rational billiards and geometric group theory.

Biography
Eskin was born in Kyiv on May 19, 1965. He is the son of a Russian-Jewish mathematician Gregory I. Eskin (b. 1936, Kiev), a professor at the University of California, Los Angeles. The family emigrated to Israel in 1974 and in 1982 to the United States.

Eskin earned his doctorate from Princeton University in 1993, under the supervision of Peter Sarnak.

Eskin has been a professor at the University of Chicago since 1999.

Awards
Eskin gave invited talks at the International Congress of Mathematicians in Berlin in 1998, and in Hyderabad in 2010.

For his contribution to joint work with David Fisher and Kevin Whyte establishing the quasi-isometric rigidity of solvable groups, Eskin was awarded the 2007 Clay Research Award. In 2012, he became a fellow of the American Mathematical Society. In April 2015, Eskin was elected a member of the United States National Academy of Sciences. Eskin won the 2020 Breakthrough Prize in mathematics for his classification of -invariant and stationary measures for the moduli of translation surfaces, in joint work with Maryam Mirzakhani.

Selected publications

References

External links
Website at University of Chicago
Paper about measure classification, joint with Maryam Mirzakhani

1965 births
20th-century American mathematicians
21st-century American mathematicians
Living people
American people of Russian-Jewish descent
Clay Research Award recipients
Dynamical systems theorists
Fellows of the American Academy of Arts and Sciences
Fellows of the American Mathematical Society
Members of the United States National Academy of Sciences
Princeton University alumni
Simons Investigator
Stanford University alumni
University of Chicago faculty